Jesse Walker (born September 4, 1970) is books editor of Reason magazine. The University of Michigan alumnus has written the books The United States of Paranoia: A Conspiracy Theory (HarperCollins, 2013) and Rebels on the Air: An Alternative History of Radio in America (NYU Press, 2001), and he maintains a blog called The Perpetual Three-Dot Column. His articles have appeared in a number of publications, including The New York Times, The Wall Street Journal, The Washington Post, The Atlantic, Salon, The New Republic, Politico, L.A. Times, L.A. Weekly, Chronicles, Boing Boing, No Depression, and the Journal of American Studies.

Views
Walker's writings display a definite libertarian bent, and he has cast a protest vote for the Libertarian Party's nominee in every presidential election of his adult lifetime except one, though "more often than not, I think they've put up a terrible candidate."

Foreign policy
Walker was critical of the War on Terror and opposed the Patriot Act. He has stated that it is a myth that the U.S. pursued an "isolationist" foreign policy between World War I and World War II.

Conspiracy Theories 
He has identified five kinds of conspiracy theories:
 The "Enemy Outside" refers to theories based on figures alleged to be scheming against a community from without.
 The "Enemy Within" finds the conspirators lurking inside the nation, indistinguishable from ordinary citizens.
 The "Enemy Above" involves powerful people manipulating events for their own gain.
 The "Enemy Below" features the lower classes working to overturn the social order.
 The "Benevolent Conspiracies" are angelic forces that work behind the scenes to improve the world and help people.

Selected bibliography
 "Every Man a Sultan: Indigenous Responses to the Somalia Crisis". Telos 103 (Spring 1995). New York: Telos Press.

References

External links
 Perpetual Three-Dot Column
 
 No Depression archive
 NPR Interview, "Suspicious? In 'United States Of Paranoia,' It's Not Just You"
 Nieman Lab Interview, "The history of American conspiracy theories holds some lessons for fake news debunkers, says Jesse Walker"
 Vice Interview, "America’s Not-So-Secret Paranoid Underbelly"
 The Atlantic, "How Russian Trolls Imitate American Political Dysfunction"
 The New Republic, "All the President’s Phantoms"

1970 births
Living people
American bloggers
American libertarians
American magazine editors
American male bloggers
American male writers
American political writers
American historians
University of Michigan alumni
Place of birth missing (living people)
21st-century American non-fiction writers